Alaska is a U.S. state on the northwest extremity of North America. A semi-exclave of the U.S., it borders British Columbia and the Yukon in Canada to the east, and it shares a western maritime border in the Bering Strait with the Russian Federation's Chukotka Autonomous Okrug. To the north are the Chukchi and Beaufort Seas of the Arctic Ocean, and the Pacific Ocean lies to the south and southwest.

Alaska is the largest U.S. state by area, comprising more total area than the next three largest states of Texas, California, and Montana combined, and is the seventh-largest subnational division in the world. It is the third-least populous and most sparsely populated U.S. state, but with a population of 736,081 as of 2020, is the continent's most populous territory located mostly north of the 60th parallel, more than quadruple the combined populations of Northern Canada and Greenland.  The state capital of Juneau is the second-largest city in the United States by area, and the former capital of Alaska, Sitka, is the largest U.S. city by area.  Approximately half of Alaska's residents live within the Anchorage metropolitan area.

Indigenous people have lived in Alaska for thousands of years, and it is widely believed that the region served as the entry point for the initial settlement of North America by way of the Bering land bridge. The Russian Empire was the first to actively colonize the area beginning in the 18th century, eventually establishing Russian America, which spanned most of the current state, and promoted and maintained a native Alaskan Creole population. The expense and logistical difficulty of maintaining this distant possession prompted its sale to the U.S. in 1867 for US$7.2 million (equivalent to $ million in ). The area went through several administrative changes before becoming organized as a territory on May 11, 1912. It was admitted as the 49th state of the U.S. on January 3, 1959.

Abundant natural resources have enabled Alaska—with one of the smallest state economies—to have one of the highest per capita incomes, with commercial fishing, and the extraction of natural gas and oil, dominating Alaska's economy. U.S. Armed Forces bases and tourism also contribute to the economy; more than half the state is federally-owned land containing national forests, national parks, and wildlife refuges.

The Indigenous population of Alaska is proportionally the highest of any U.S. state, at over 15 percent. Various Indigenous languages are spoken, and Alaskan Natives are influential in local and state politics.

Etymology
The name "Alaska" was introduced in the Russian colonial period when it was used to refer to the Alaska Peninsula. It was derived from an Aleut-language idiom, meaning "the mainland" or, more literally, "the object towards which the action of the sea is directed".

History

Pre-colonization

Numerous indigenous peoples occupied Alaska for thousands of years before the arrival of European peoples to the area. Linguistic and DNA studies done here have provided evidence for the settlement of North America by way of the Bering land bridge. At the Upward Sun River site in the Tanana Valley in Alaska, remains of a six-week-old infant were found. The baby's DNA showed that she belonged to a population that was genetically separate from other native groups present elsewhere in the New World at the end of the Pleistocene. Ben Potter, the University of Alaska Fairbanks archaeologist who unearthed the remains at the Upward Sun River site in 2013, named this new group Ancient Beringians.

The Tlingit people developed a society with a matrilineal kinship system of property inheritance and descent in what is today Southeast Alaska, along with parts of British Columbia and the Yukon. Also in Southeast were the Haida, now well known for their unique arts. The Tsimshian people came to Alaska from British Columbia in 1887, when President Grover Cleveland, and later the U.S. Congress, granted them permission to settle on Annette Island and found the town of Metlakatla. All three of these peoples, as well as other indigenous peoples of the Pacific Northwest Coast, experienced smallpox outbreaks from the late 18th through the mid-19th century, with the most devastating epidemics occurring in the 1830s and 1860s, resulting in high fatalities and social disruption.

The Aleutian Islands are still home to the Aleut people's seafaring society, although they were the first Native Alaskans to be exploited by the Russians. Western and Southwestern Alaska are home to the Yup'ik, while their cousins the Alutiiq ~ Sugpiaq live in what is now Southcentral Alaska. The Gwich'in people of the northern Interior region are Athabaskan and primarily known today for their dependence on the caribou within the much-contested Arctic National Wildlife Refuge. The North Slope and Little Diomede Island are occupied by the widespread Inupiat people.

Colonization

Some researchers believe the first Russian settlement in Alaska was established in the 17th century. According to this hypothesis, in 1648 several koches of Semyon Dezhnyov's expedition came ashore in Alaska by storm and founded this settlement. This hypothesis is based on the testimony of Chukchi geographer Nikolai Daurkin, who had visited Alaska in 1764–1765 and who had reported on a village on the Kheuveren River, populated by "bearded men" who "pray to the icons". Some modern researchers associate Kheuveren with Koyuk River.

The first European vessel to reach Alaska is generally held to be the St. Gabriel under the authority of the surveyor M. S. Gvozdev and assistant navigator I. Fyodorov on August 21, 1732, during an expedition of Siberian Cossack A. F. Shestakov and Russian explorer Dmitry Pavlutsky (1729–1735). Another European contact with Alaska occurred in 1741, when Vitus Bering led an expedition for the Russian Navy aboard the St. Peter. After his crew returned to Russia with sea otter pelts judged to be the finest fur in the world, small associations of fur traders began to sail from the shores of Siberia toward the Aleutian Islands. The first permanent European settlement was founded in 1784.

Between 1774 and 1800, Spain sent several expeditions to Alaska to assert its claim over the Pacific Northwest. In 1789, a Spanish settlement and fort were built in Nootka Sound. These expeditions gave names to places such as Valdez, Bucareli Sound, and Cordova. Later, the Russian-American Company carried out an expanded colonization program during the early-to-mid-19th century. Sitka, renamed New Archangel from 1804 to 1867, on Baranof Island in the Alexander Archipelago in what is now Southeast Alaska, became the capital of Russian America. It remained the capital after the colony was transferred to the United States. The Russians never fully colonized Alaska, and the colony was never very profitable. Evidence of Russian settlement in names and churches survive throughout southeastern Alaska.

William H. Seward, the 24th United States Secretary of State, negotiated the Alaska Purchase (also known as Seward's Folly) with the Russians in 1867 for $7.2 million. Russia's contemporary ruler Tsar Alexander II, the Emperor of the Russian Empire, King of Poland and Grand Duke of Finland, also planned the sale; the purchase was made on March 30, 1867. Six months later the commissioners arrived in Sitka and the formal transfer was arranged; the formal flag-raising took place at Fort Sitka on October 18, 1867. In the ceremony 250 uniformed U.S. soldiers marched to the governor's house at "Castle Hill", where the Russian troops lowered the Russian flag and the U.S. flag was raised. This event is celebrated as Alaska Day, a legal holiday on October 18.

Alaska was loosely governed by the military initially, and was administered as a district starting in 1884, with a governor appointed by the United States president. A federal district court was headquartered in Sitka. For most of Alaska's first decade under the United States flag, Sitka was the only community inhabited by American settlers. They organized a "provisional city government", which was Alaska's first municipal government, but not in a legal sense. Legislation allowing Alaskan communities to legally incorporate as cities did not come about until 1900, and home rule for cities was extremely limited or unavailable until statehood took effect in 1959.

Alaska as an incorporated U.S. territory

Starting in the 1890s and stretching in some places to the early 1910s, gold rushes in Alaska and the nearby Yukon Territory brought thousands of miners and settlers to Alaska. Alaska was officially incorporated as an organized territory in 1912. Alaska's capital, which had been in Sitka until 1906, was moved north to Juneau. Construction of the Alaska Governor's Mansion began that same year. European immigrants from Norway and Sweden also settled in southeast Alaska, where they entered the fishing and logging industries.

During World War II, the Aleutian Islands Campaign focused on Attu, Agattu and Kiska, all of which were occupied by the Empire of Japan. During the Japanese occupation, a white American civilian and two United States Navy personnel were killed at Attu and Kiska respectively, and nearly a total of 50 Aleut civilians and eight sailors were interned in Japan. About half of the Aleuts died during the period of internment. Unalaska/Dutch Harbor and Adak became significant bases for the United States Army, United States Army Air Forces and United States Navy. The United States Lend-Lease program involved flying American warplanes through Canada to Fairbanks and then Nome; Soviet pilots took possession of these aircraft, ferrying them to fight the German invasion of the Soviet Union. The construction of military bases contributed to the population growth of some Alaskan cities.

Statehood

Statehood for Alaska was an important cause of James Wickersham early in his tenure as a congressional delegate. Decades later, the statehood movement gained its first real momentum following a territorial referendum in 1946. The Alaska Statehood Committee and Alaska's Constitutional Convention would soon follow. Statehood supporters also found themselves fighting major battles against political foes, mostly in the U.S. Congress but also within Alaska. Statehood was approved by the U.S. Congress on July 7, 1958; Alaska was officially proclaimed a state on January 3, 1959.

Good Friday earthquake

On March 27, 1964, the massive Good Friday earthquake killed 133 people and destroyed several villages and portions of large coastal communities, mainly by the resultant tsunamis and landslides. It was the fourth-most-powerful earthquake in recorded history, with a moment magnitude of 9.2 (more than a thousand times as powerful as the 1989 San Francisco earthquake). The time of day (5:36 pm), time of year (spring) and location of the epicenter were all cited as factors in potentially sparing thousands of lives, particularly in Anchorage.

Soil liquefaction, fissures, landslides, and other ground failures caused major structural damage in several communities and much damage to property.

In Prince William Sound, Port Valdez suffered a massive underwater landslide, resulting in the deaths of 32 people between the collapse of the Valdez city harbor and docks, and inside the ship that was docked there at the time. Nearby, a  tsunami destroyed the village of Chenega, killing 23 of the 68 people who lived there; survivors out-ran the wave, climbing to high ground. Post-quake tsunamis severely affected Whittier, Seward, Kodiak, and other Alaskan communities, as well as people and property in British Columbia, Washington, Oregon, and California. Tsunamis also caused damage in Hawaii and Japan. Evidence of motion directly related to the earthquake was also reported from Florida and Texas.

Alaska had never experienced a major disaster in a highly populated area before, and had very limited resources for dealing with the effects of such an event. In Anchorage, at the urging of geologist Lidia Selkregg, the City of Anchorage and the Alaska State Housing Authority appointed a team of 40 scientists, including geologists, soil scientists, and engineers, to assess the damage done by the earthquake to the city. The team, called the Engineering and Geological Evaluation Group, was headed by Dr. Ruth A. M. Schmidt, a geology professor at the University of Alaska Anchorage. The team of scientists came into conflict with local developers and downtown business owners who wanted to immediately rebuild; the scientists wanted to identify future dangers to ensure that rebuilt infrastructure would be safe. The team produced a report on May 8, 1964, just a little more than a month after the earthquake.

The United States military, which has a large active presence in Alaska, also stepped in to assist within moments of the end of the quake. The U.S. Army rapidly re-established communications with the lower 48 states, deployed troops to assist the citizens of Anchorage, and dispatched a convoy to Valdez. On the advice of military and civilian leaders, President Lyndon B. Johnson declared all of Alaska a major disaster area the day after the quake. The U.S. Navy and U.S. Coast Guard deployed ships to isolated coastal communities to assist with immediate needs. Bad weather and poor visibility hampered air rescue and observation efforts the day after the quake, but on Sunday the 29th the situation improved and rescue helicopters and observation aircraft were deployed. A military airlift immediately began shipping relief supplies to Alaska, eventually delivering  of food and other supplies. Broadcast journalist, Genie Chance, assisted in recovery and relief efforts, staying on the KENI air waves over Anchorage for more than 24 continuous hours as the voice of calm from her temporary post within the Anchorage Public Safety Building. She was effectively designated as the public safety officer by the city's police chief. Chance provided breaking news of the catastrophic events that continued to develop following the magnitude 9.2 earthquake, and she served as the voice of the public safety office, coordinating response efforts, connecting available resources to needs around the community, disseminating information about shelters and prepared food rations, passing messages of well-being between loved ones, and helping to reunite families.

In the longer term, the U.S. Army Corps of Engineers led the effort to rebuild roads, clear debris, and establish new townsites for communities that had been completely destroyed, at a cost of $110 million. The West Coast and Alaska Tsunami Warning Center was formed as a direct response to the disaster. Federal disaster relief funds paid for reconstruction as well as financially supporting the devastated infrastructure of Alaska's government, spending hundreds of millions of dollars that helped keep Alaska financially solvent until the discovery of massive oil deposits at Prudhoe Bay. At the order of the U.S. Defense Department, the Alaska National Guard founded the Alaska Division of Emergency Services to respond to any future disasters.

Alaska oil boom 
The 1968 discovery of oil at Prudhoe Bay and the 1977 completion of the Trans-Alaska Pipeline System led to an oil boom. Royalty revenues from oil have funded large state budgets from 1980 onward.

Oil production was not the only economic value of Alaska's land, however. In the second half of the 20th century, Alaska discovered tourism as an important source of revenue. Tourism became popular after World War II, when military personnel stationed in the region returned home praising its natural splendor. The Alcan Highway, built during the war, and the Alaska Marine Highway System, completed in 1963, made the state more accessible than before. Tourism became increasingly important in Alaska, and today over 1.4 million people visit the state each year.

With tourism more vital to the economy, environmentalism also rose in importance. The Alaska National Interest Lands Conservation Act (ANILCA) of 1980 added 53.7 million acres (217,000 km2) to the National Wildlife Refuge system, parts of 25 rivers to the National Wild and Scenic Rivers system, 3.3 million acres (13,000 km2) to National Forest lands, and 43.6 million acres (176,000 km2) to National Park land. Because of the Act, Alaska now contains two-thirds of all American national parklands. Today, more than half of Alaskan land is owned by the Federal Government.

Today, the battle between philosophies of development and conservation is seen in the contentious debate over oil drilling in the Arctic National Wildlife Refuge and the proposed Pebble Mine.

Geography

Located at the northwest corner of North America, Alaska is the northernmost and westernmost state in the United States, but also has the most easterly longitude in the United States because the Aleutian Islands extend into the Eastern Hemisphere. It is technically part of the continental U.S., but is sometimes not included in colloquial use; Alaska is not part of the contiguous U.S., often called "the Lower 48". The capital city, Juneau, is situated on the mainland of the North American continent but is not connected by road to the rest of the North American highway system.

The state is bordered by Canada's Yukon and British Columbia to the east (making it the only state to only border a Canadian territory); the Gulf of Alaska and the Pacific Ocean to the south and southwest; the Bering Sea, Bering Strait, and Chukchi Sea to the west; and the Arctic Ocean to the north. Alaska has a longer coastline than all the other U.S. states combined.

At  in total area, Alaska is by far the largest state in the United States. Alaska is more than twice the size of the second-largest U.S. state (Texas), and it is larger than the next three largest states (Texas, California, and Montana) combined. Alaska is the seventh largest subnational division in the world. If it was an independent nation would be the 17th largest country in the world, larger than Iran.

The Aleutian Islands chain extends west from the southern tip of the Alaska Peninsula. Many active volcanoes are found in the Aleutians and in coastal regions. The chain of volcanoes extends to Mount Spurr, west of Anchorage on the mainland. Geologists have identified Alaska as part of Wrangellia, a large region consisting of multiple states and Canadian provinces in the Pacific Northwest, which is actively undergoing continent building.

Alaska has more than three million lakes. Marshlands and wetland permafrost cover  (mostly in northern, western and southwest flatlands). The Bering Glacier is the largest glacier in North America, covering  alone.

Regions
There are no officially defined borders demarcating the various regions of Alaska, but there are six widely accepted regions:

South Central

The most populous region of Alaska, containing Anchorage, the Matanuska-Susitna Valley and the Kenai Peninsula. Rural, mostly unpopulated areas south of the Alaska Range and west of the Wrangell Mountains also fall within the definition of South Central, as do the Prince William Sound area and the communities of Cordova and Valdez.

Southeast

Also referred to as the Panhandle or Inside Passage, this is the region of Alaska closest to the contiguous states. As such, this was where most of the initial non-indigenous settlement occurred in the years following the Alaska Purchase. The region is dominated by the Alexander Archipelago as well as the Tongass National Forest, the largest national forest in the United States. It contains the state capital Juneau, the former capital Sitka, and Ketchikan, at one time Alaska's largest city. The Alaska Marine Highway provides a vital surface transportation link throughout the area and country, as only three communities (Haines, Hyder and Skagway) enjoy direct connections to the contiguous North American road system.

Interior

The Interior is the largest region of Alaska; much of it is uninhabited wilderness. Fairbanks is the only large city in the region. Denali National Park and Preserve is located here. Denali, formerly Mount McKinley, is the highest mountain in North America, and is also located here.

Southwest
Most of the population lives along the coast. Kodiak Island is also located in Southwest. The massive Yukon–Kuskokwim Delta, one of the largest river deltas in the world, is here. Portions of the Alaska Peninsula are considered part of Southwest, with the remaining portions included with the Aleutian Islands (see below).

North Slope

The North Slope is mostly tundra peppered with small villages. The area is known for its massive reserves of crude oil and contains both the National Petroleum Reserve–Alaska and the Prudhoe Bay Oil Field. The city of Utqiaġvik, formerly known as Barrow, is the northernmost city in the United States and is located here. The Northwest Arctic area, anchored by Kotzebue and also containing the Kobuk River valley, is often regarded as being part of this region. However, the respective Inupiat of the North Slope and of the Northwest Arctic seldom consider themselves to be one people.

Aleutian Islands

More than 300 small volcanic islands make up this chain, which stretches more than  into the Pacific Ocean. Some of these islands fall in the Eastern Hemisphere, but the International Date Line was drawn west of 180° to keep the whole state, and thus the entire North American continent, within the same legal day. Two of the islands, Attu and Kiska, were occupied by Japanese forces during World War II.

Land ownership 
According to an October 1998 report by the United States Bureau of Land Management, approximately 65% of Alaska is owned and managed by the U.S. federal government as public lands, including a multitude of national forests, national parks, and national wildlife refuges. Of these, the Bureau of Land Management manages , or 23.8% of the state. The Arctic National Wildlife Refuge is managed by the United States Fish and Wildlife Service. It is the world's largest wildlife refuge, comprising .

Of the remaining land area, the state of Alaska owns , its entitlement under the Alaska Statehood Act. A portion of that acreage is occasionally ceded to the organized boroughs presented above, under the statutory provisions pertaining to newly formed boroughs. Smaller portions are set aside for rural subdivisions and other homesteading-related opportunities. These are not very popular due to the often remote and roadless locations. The University of Alaska, as a land grant university, also owns substantial acreage which it manages independently.

Another  are owned by 12 regional, and scores of local, Native corporations created under the Alaska Native Claims Settlement Act (ANCSA) of 1971. Regional Native corporation Doyon, Limited often promotes itself as the largest private landowner in Alaska in advertisements and other communications. Provisions of ANCSA allowing the corporations' land holdings to be sold on the open market starting in 1991 were repealed before they could take effect. Effectively, the corporations hold title (including subsurface title in many cases, a privilege denied to individual Alaskans) but cannot sell the land. Individual Native allotments can be and are sold on the open market, however.

Various private interests own the remaining land, totaling about one percent of the state. Alaska is, by a large margin, the state with the smallest percentage of private land ownership when Native corporation holdings are excluded.

Alaska Heritage Resources Survey 
The Alaska Heritage Resources Survey (AHRS) is a restricted inventory of all reported historic and prehistoric sites within the U.S. state of Alaska; it is maintained by the Office of History and Archaeology. The survey's inventory of cultural resources includes objects, structures, buildings, sites, districts, and travel ways, with a general provision that they are more than fifty years old. , more than 35,000 sites have been reported.

Cities, towns and boroughs

Alaska is not divided into counties, as most of the other U.S. states, but it is divided into boroughs. Delegates to the Alaska Constitutional Convention wanted to avoid the pitfalls of the traditional county system and adopted their own unique model. Many of the more densely populated parts of the state are part of Alaska's 16 boroughs, which function somewhat similarly to counties in other states. However, unlike county-equivalents in the other 49 states, the boroughs do not cover the entire land area of the state. The area not part of any borough is referred to as the Unorganized Borough.

The Unorganized Borough has no government of its own, but the U.S. Census Bureau in cooperation with the state divided the Unorganized Borough into 11 census areas solely for the purposes of statistical analysis and presentation. A recording district is a mechanism for management of the public record in Alaska. The state is divided into 34 recording districts which are centrally administered under a state recorder. All recording districts use the same acceptance criteria, fee schedule, etc., for accepting documents into the public record.

Whereas many U.S. states use a three-tiered system of decentralization—state/county/township—most of Alaska uses only two tiers—state/borough. Owing to the low population density, most of the land is located in the Unorganized Borough. As the name implies, it has no intermediate borough government but is administered directly by the state government. In 2000, 57.71% of Alaska's area has this status, with 13.05% of the population.

Anchorage merged the city government with the Greater Anchorage Area Borough in 1975 to form the Municipality of Anchorage, containing the city proper and the communities of Eagle River, Chugiak, Peters Creek, Girdwood, Bird, and Indian. Fairbanks has a separate borough (the Fairbanks North Star Borough) and municipality (the City of Fairbanks).

The state's most populous city is Anchorage, home to 291,247 people in 2020. The richest location in Alaska by per capita income is Denali ($42,245). Yakutat City, Sitka, Juneau, and Anchorage are the four largest cities in the U.S. by area.

Cities and census-designated places (by population)
As reflected in the 2020 United States census, Alaska has a total of 355 incorporated cities and census-designated places (CDPs). The tally of cities includes four unified municipalities, essentially the equivalent of a consolidated city–county. The majority of these communities are located in the rural expanse of Alaska known as "The Bush" and are unconnected to that contiguous North American road network. The table at the bottom of this section lists about the 100 largest cities and census-designated places in Alaska, in population order.

Of Alaska's 2020 U.S. census population figure of 733,391, 16,655 people, or 2.27% of the population, did not live in an incorporated city or census-designated place. Approximately three-quarters of that figure were people who live in urban and suburban neighborhoods on the outskirts of the city limits of Ketchikan, Kodiak, Palmer and Wasilla. CDPs have not been established for these areas by the United States Census Bureau, except that seven CDPs were established for the Ketchikan-area neighborhoods in the 1980 Census (Clover Pass, Herring Cove, Ketchikan East, Mountain Point, North Tongass Highway, Pennock Island and Saxman East), but have not been used since. The remaining population was scattered throughout Alaska, both within organized boroughs and in the Unorganized Borough, in largely remote areas.

Climate

The climate in south and southeastern Alaska is a mid-latitude oceanic climate (Köppen climate classification: Cfb), and a subarctic oceanic climate (Köppen Cfc) in the northern parts. On an annual basis, the southeast is both the wettest and warmest part of Alaska with milder temperatures in the winter and high precipitation throughout the year. This is also the only region in Alaska in which the average daytime high temperature is above freezing during the winter months.The climate of Anchorage and south central Alaska is mild by Alaskan standards due to the region's proximity to the seacoast. While the area gets less rain than southeast Alaska, it gets more snow, and days tend to be clearer. It is a subarctic climate (Köppen: Dfc) due to its brief, cool summers.

The climate of western Alaska is determined in large part by the Bering Sea and the Gulf of Alaska. It is a subarctic oceanic climate in the southwest and a continental subarctic climate farther north. The temperature is somewhat moderate considering how far north the area is. This region has a tremendous amount of variety in precipitation.

The climate of the interior of Alaska is subarctic. Some of the highest and lowest temperatures in Alaska occur around the area near Fairbanks. The summers may have temperatures reaching into the 90s °F (the low-to-mid 30s °C), while in the winter, the temperature can fall below . Precipitation is sparse in the Interior, often less than  a year, but what precipitation falls in the winter tends to stay the entire winter.

The highest and lowest recorded temperatures in Alaska are both in the Interior.

The climate in the extreme north of Alaska is Arctic (Köppen: ET) with long, very cold winters and short, cool summers.

Demographics

The United States Census Bureau found in the 2020 United States census that the population of Alaska was 733,391 on April 1, 2020, a 3.3% increase since the 2010 United States census. According to the 2010 United States census, the U.S. state of Alaska had a population of 710,231, a 13.3% increase from 626,932 at the 2000 U.S. census.

In 2010, Alaska ranked as the 47th state by population, ahead of North Dakota, Vermont, and Wyoming (and Washington, D.C.). Estimates show North Dakota ahead . Alaska is by far the largest U.S. state by area, and the tenth wealthiest (per capita income).  due to its population size, it is one of 14 U.S. states that still have only one telephone area code.

According to HUD's 2022 Annual Homeless Assessment Report, there were an estimated 2,320 homeless people in Alaska.

Race and ethnicity

The 2019 American Community Survey estimated 60.2% of the population was non-Hispanic white, 3.7% black or African American, 15.6% American Indian or Alaska Native, 6.5% Asian, 1.4% Native Hawaiian and other Pacific Islander, 7.5% two or more races, and 7.3% Hispanic or Latin American of any race. At the survey estimates, 7.8% of the total population was foreign-born from 2015 to 2019. In 2015, 61.3% was non-Hispanic white, 3.4% black or African American, 13.3% American Indian or Alaska Native, 6.2% Asian, 0.9% Native Hawaiian and other Pacific Islander, 0.3% some other race, and 7.7% multiracial. Hispanics and Latin Americans were 7% of the state population in 2015. From 2015 to 2019, the largest Hispanic and Latin American groups were Mexican Americans, Puerto Ricans, and Cuban Americans. The largest Asian groups living in the state were Filipinos, Korean Americans, and Japanese and Chinese Americans.

The state was 66.7% white (64.1% non-Hispanic white), 14.8% American Indian and Alaska Native, 5.4% Asian, 3.3% black or African American, 1.0% Native Hawaiian and other Pacific Islander, 1.6% from some other race, and 7.3% from two or more races in 2010. Hispanics or Latin Americans of any race made up 5.5% of the population in 2010. , 50.7% of Alaska's population younger than one year of age belonged to minority groups (i.e., did not have two parents of non-Hispanic white ancestry). In 1960, the United States Census Bureau reported Alaska's population as 77.2% white, 3% black, and 18.8% American Indian and Alaska Native.

Languages

According to the 2011 American Community Survey, 83.4% of people over the age of five spoke only English at home. About 3.5% spoke Spanish at home, 2.2% spoke another Indo-European language, about 4.3% spoke an Asian language (including Tagalog), and about 5.3% spoke other languages at home. In 2019, the American Community Survey determined 83.7% spoke only English, and 16.3% spoke another language other than English. The most spoken European language after English was Spanish, spoken by approximately 4.0% of the state population. Collectively, Asian and Pacific Islander languages were spoken by 5.6% of Alaskans. Since 2010, a total of 5.2% of Alaskans speak one of the state's 20 indigenous languages, known locally as "native languages".

The Alaska Native Language Center at the University of Alaska Fairbanks claims that at least 20 Alaskan native languages exist and there are also some languages with different dialects. Most of Alaska's native languages belong to either the Eskimo–Aleut or Na-Dene language families; however, some languages are thought to be isolates (e.g. Haida) or have not yet been classified (e.g. Tsimshianic).  nearly all of Alaska's native languages were classified as either threatened, shifting, moribund, nearly extinct, or dormant languages.

In October 2014, the governor of Alaska signed a bill declaring the state's 20 indigenous languages to have official status. This bill gave them symbolic recognition as official languages, though they have not been adopted for official use within the government. The 20 languages that were included in the bill are:

 Inupiaq
 Siberian Yupik
 Central Alaskan Yup'ik
 Alutiiq
 Unangax
 Dena'ina
 Deg Xinag
 Holikachuk
 Koyukon
 Upper Kuskokwim
 Gwich'in
 Tanana
 Upper Tanana
 Tanacross
 Hän
 Ahtna
 Eyak
 Tlingit
 Haida
 Tsimshian

Religion

According to statistics collected by the Association of Religion Data Archives from 2010, about 34% of Alaska residents were members of religious congregations. Of the religious population, 100,960 people identified as evangelical Protestants; 50,866 as Roman Catholic; and 32,550 as mainline Protestants. Roughly 4% were Mormon, 0.5% Jewish, 0.5% Muslim, 1% Buddhist, 0.2% Baháʼí, and 0.5% Hindu. The largest religious denominations in Alaska  was the Roman Catholic Church with 50,866 adherents; non-denominational Evangelicals with 38,070 adherents; The Church of Jesus Christ of Latter-day Saints with 32,170 adherents; and the Southern Baptist Convention with 19,891 adherents. Alaska has been identified, along with Washington and Oregon in the Pacific Northwest, as being the least religious states in the United States, in terms of church membership.

The Pew Research Center in 2014 determined 62% of the adult population practiced Christianity. Protestantism was the largest Christian tradition, dominated by Evangelicalism. Mainline Protestants were the second largest Protestant Christian group, followed by predominantly African American churches. The Roman Catholic Church remained the largest single Christian tradition practiced in Alaska. Of the unaffiliated population, they made up the largest non-Christian religious affiliation. Atheists made up 5% of the population and the largest non-Christian religion was Buddhism. In 2020, the Public Religion Research Institute determined 57% of adults were Christian.

In 1795, the first Russian Orthodox Church was established in Kodiak. Intermarriage with Alaskan Natives helped the Russian immigrants integrate into society. As a result, an increasing number of Russian Orthodox churches gradually became established within Alaska. Alaska also has the largest Quaker population (by percentage) of any state. In 2009, there were 6,000 Jews in Alaska (for whom observance of halakha may pose special problems). Alaskan Hindus often share venues and celebrations with members of other Asian religious communities, including Sikhs and Jains. In 2010, Alaskan Hindus established the Sri Ganesha Temple of Alaska, making it the first Hindu Temple in Alaska and the northernmost Hindu Temple in the world. There are an estimated 2,000–3,000 Hindus in Alaska. The vast majority of Hindus live in Anchorage or Fairbanks.

Estimates for the number of Muslims in Alaska range from 2,000 to 5,000. The Islamic Community Center of Anchorage began efforts in the late 1990s to construct a mosque in Anchorage. They broke ground on a building in south Anchorage in 2010 and were nearing completion in late 2014. When completed, the mosque will be the first in the state and one of the northernmost mosques in the world. There's also a Baháʼí center.

Economy

As of October 2022, Alaska had a total employment of 316,900. The number of employer establishments was 21,077.

The 2018 gross state product was $55 billion, 48th in the U.S. Its per capita personal income for 2018 was $73,000, ranking 7th in the nation. According to a 2013 study by Phoenix Marketing International, Alaska had the fifth-largest number of millionaires per capita in the United States, with a ratio of 6.75 percent. The oil and gas industry dominates the Alaskan economy, with more than 80% of the state's revenues derived from petroleum extraction. Alaska's main export product (excluding oil and natural gas) is seafood, primarily salmon, cod, pollock and crab.

Agriculture represents a very small fraction of the Alaskan economy. Agricultural production is primarily for consumption within the state and includes nursery stock, dairy products, vegetables, and livestock. Manufacturing is limited, with most foodstuffs and general goods imported from elsewhere.

Employment is primarily in government and industries such as natural resource extraction, shipping, and transportation. Military bases are a significant component of the economy in the Fairbanks North Star, Anchorage and Kodiak Island boroughs, as well as Kodiak. Federal subsidies are also an important part of the economy, allowing the state to keep taxes low. Its industrial outputs are crude petroleum, natural gas, coal, gold, precious metals, zinc and other mining, seafood processing, timber and wood products. There is also a growing service and tourism sector. Tourists have contributed to the economy by supporting local lodging.

Energy

Alaska has vast energy resources, although its oil reserves have been largely depleted. Major oil and gas reserves were found in the Alaska North Slope (ANS) and Cook Inlet basins, but according to the Energy Information Administration, by February 2014 Alaska had fallen to fourth place in the nation in crude oil production after Texas, North Dakota, and California.

Additionally, substantial coal deposits are found in Alaska's bituminous, sub-bituminous, and lignite coal basins. Alaska also offers some of the highest hydroelectric power potential in the country from its numerous rivers. Large swaths of the Alaskan coastline offer wind and geothermal energy potential as well.

Alaska's economy depends heavily on increasingly expensive diesel fuel for heating, transportation, electric power and light. Although wind and hydroelectric power are abundant and underdeveloped, proposals for statewide energy systems (e.g. with special low-cost electric interties) were judged uneconomical (at the time of the report, 2001) due to low (less than 50¢/gal) fuel prices, long distances and low population. The cost of a gallon of gas in urban Alaska today is usually thirty to sixty cents higher than the national average; prices in rural areas are generally significantly higher but vary widely depending on transportation costs, seasonal usage peaks, nearby petroleum development infrastructure and many other factors.

Permanent Fund
The Alaska Permanent Fund is a constitutionally authorized appropriation of oil revenues, established by voters in 1976 to manage a surplus in state petroleum revenues from oil, largely in anticipation of the then recently constructed Trans-Alaska Pipeline System. The fund was originally proposed by Governor Keith Miller on the eve of the 1969 Prudhoe Bay lease sale, out of fear that the legislature would spend the entire proceeds of the sale (which amounted to $900 million) at once. It was later championed by Governor Jay Hammond and Kenai state representative Hugh Malone. It has served as an attractive political prospect ever since, diverting revenues which would normally be deposited into the general fund.

The Alaska Constitution was written so as to discourage dedicating state funds for a particular purpose. The Permanent Fund has become the rare exception to this, mostly due to the political climate of distrust existing during the time of its creation. From its initial principal of $734,000, the fund has grown to $50 billion as a result of oil royalties and capital investment programs. Most if not all the principal is invested conservatively outside Alaska. This has led to frequent calls by Alaskan politicians for the Fund to make investments within Alaska, though such a stance has never gained momentum.

Starting in 1982, dividends from the fund's annual growth have been paid out each year to eligible Alaskans, ranging from an initial $1,000 in 1982 (equal to three years' payout, as the distribution of payments was held up in a lawsuit over the distribution scheme) to $3,269 in 2008 (which included a one-time $1,200 "Resource Rebate"). Every year, the state legislature takes out 8% from the earnings, puts 3% back into the principal for inflation proofing, and the remaining 5% is distributed to all qualifying Alaskans. To qualify for the Permanent Fund Dividend, one must have lived in the state for a minimum of 12 months, maintain constant residency subject to allowable absences, and not be subject to court judgments or criminal convictions which fall under various disqualifying classifications or may subject the payment amount to civil garnishment.

The Permanent Fund is often considered to be one of the leading examples of a basic income policy in the world.

Cost of living
The cost of goods in Alaska has long been higher than in the contiguous 48 states. Federal government employees, particularly United States Postal Service (USPS) workers and active-duty military members, receive a Cost of Living Allowance usually set at 25% of base pay because, while the cost of living has gone down, it is still one of the highest in the country.

Rural Alaska suffers from extremely high prices for food and consumer goods compared to the rest of the country, due to the relatively limited transportation infrastructure.

Agriculture and fishing

Due to the northern climate and short growing season, relatively little farming occurs in Alaska. The short 100-day growing season limits the crops that can be grown, but the long sunny summer days make for productive growing seasons. The primary crops are potatoes, carrots, lettuce, and cabbage.

This area was largely set aside and developed under a state program spearheaded by Hammond during his second term as governor. Delta-area crops consist predominantly of barley and hay. West of Fairbanks lies another concentration of small farms catering to restaurants, the hotel and tourist industry, and community-supported agriculture.

Alaskan agriculture has experienced a surge in growth of market gardeners, small farms and farmers' markets in recent years, with the highest percentage increase (46%) in the nation in growth in farmers' markets in 2011, compared to 17% nationwide. The peony industry has also taken off, as the growing season allows farmers to harvest during a gap in supply elsewhere in the world, thereby filling a niche in the flower market.

Alaska, with no counties, lacks county fairs. However, a small assortment of state and local fairs (with the Alaska State Fair in Palmer the largest), are held mostly in the late summer. The fairs are mostly located in communities with historic or current agricultural activity, and feature local farmers exhibiting produce in addition to more high-profile commercial activities such as carnival rides, concerts and food. "Alaska Grown" is used as an agricultural slogan.

Alaska has an abundance of seafood, with the primary fisheries in the Bering Sea and the North Pacific. Seafood is one of the few food items that is often cheaper within the state than outside it. Many Alaskans take advantage of salmon seasons to harvest portions of their household diet while fishing for subsistence, as well as sport. This includes fish taken by hook, net or wheel.

Hunting for subsistence, primarily caribou, moose, and Dall sheep is still common in the state, particularly in remote Bush communities. An example of a traditional native food is Akutaq, the Eskimo ice cream, which can consist of reindeer fat, seal oil, dried fish meat and local berries.

Alaska's reindeer herding is concentrated on Seward Peninsula, where wild caribou can be prevented from mingling and migrating with the domesticated reindeer.

Most food in Alaska is transported into the state from "Outside" (the other 49 US states), and shipping costs make food in the cities relatively expensive. In rural areas, subsistence hunting and gathering is an essential activity because imported food is prohibitively expensive. Although most small towns and villages in Alaska lie along the coastline, the cost of importing food to remote villages can be high, because of the terrain and difficult road conditions, which change dramatically, due to varying climate and precipitation changes. The cost of transport can reach as high as 50¢ per pound ($1.10/kg) or more in some remote areas, during the most difficult times, if these locations can be reached at all during such inclement weather and terrain conditions. Fuel cost per gallon is routinely twenty to thirty cents higher than the contiguous United States average, with only Hawaii having higher prices.

Culture

Some of Alaska's popular annual events are the Iditarod Trail Sled Dog Race from Anchorage to Nome, World Ice Art Championships in Fairbanks, the Blueberry Festival and Alaska Hummingbird Festival in Ketchikan, the Sitka Whale Fest, and the Stikine River Garnet Fest in Wrangell. The Stikine River attracts the largest springtime concentration of American bald eagles in the world.

The Alaska Native Heritage Center celebrates the rich heritage of Alaska's 11 cultural groups. Their purpose is to encourage cross-cultural exchanges among all people and enhance self-esteem among Native people. The Alaska Native Arts Foundation promotes and markets Native art from all regions and cultures in the State, using the internet.

Music

Influences on music in Alaska include the traditional music of Alaska Natives as well as folk music brought by later immigrants from Russia and Europe. Prominent musicians from Alaska include singer Jewel, traditional Aleut flautist Mary Youngblood, folk singer-songwriter Libby Roderick, Christian music singer-songwriter Lincoln Brewster, metal/post hardcore band 36 Crazyfists and the groups Pamyua and Portugal. The Man.

There are many established music festivals in Alaska, including the Alaska Folk Festival, the Fairbanks Summer Arts Festival the Anchorage Folk Festival, the Athabascan Old-Time Fiddling Festival, the Sitka Jazz Festival, and the Sitka Summer Music Festival. The most prominent orchestra in Alaska is the Anchorage Symphony Orchestra, though the Fairbanks Symphony Orchestra and Juneau Symphony are also notable. The Anchorage Opera is currently the state's only professional opera company, though there are several volunteer and semi-professional organizations in the state as well.

The official state song of Alaska is "Alaska's Flag", which was adopted in 1955; it celebrates the flag of Alaska.

Alaska on film and television

The 1983 Disney movie Never Cry Wolf was at least partially shot in Alaska. The 1991 film White Fang, based on Jack London's 1906 novel and starring Ethan Hawke, was filmed in and around Haines. Steven Seagal's 1994 On Deadly Ground, starring Michael Caine, was filmed in part at the Worthington Glacier near Valdez.

Many reality television shows are filmed in Alaska. In 2011, the Anchorage Daily News found ten set in the state.

Sports

Public health and public safety

The Alaska State Troopers are Alaska's statewide police force. They have a long and storied history, but were not an official organization until 1941. Before the force was officially organized, law enforcement in Alaska was handled by various federal agencies. Larger towns usually have their own local police and some villages rely on "Public Safety Officers" who have police training but do not carry firearms. In much of the state, the troopers serve as the only police force available. In addition to enforcing traffic and criminal law, wildlife Troopers enforce hunting and fishing regulations. Due to the varied terrain and wide scope of the Troopers' duties, they employ a wide variety of land, air, and water patrol vehicles.

Many rural communities in Alaska are considered "dry", having outlawed the importation of alcoholic beverages. Suicide rates for rural residents are higher than urban.

Domestic abuse and other violent crimes are also at high levels in the state; this is in part linked to alcohol abuse. Alaska has the highest rate of sexual assault in the nation, especially in rural areas. The average age of sexually assaulted victims is 16 years old. In four out of five cases, the suspects were relatives, friends or acquaintances.

Health insurance 
, CVS Health and Premera account for 47% and 46% of private health insurance, respectively. Premera and Moda Health offer insurance on the federally-run Affordable Care Exchange.

Education

The Alaska Department of Education and Early Development administers many school districts in Alaska. In addition, the state operates a boarding school, Mt. Edgecumbe High School in Sitka, and provides partial funding for other boarding schools, including Nenana Student Living Center in Nenana and The Galena Interior Learning Academy in Galena.

There are more than a dozen colleges and universities in Alaska. Accredited universities in Alaska include the University of Alaska Anchorage, University of Alaska Fairbanks, University of Alaska Southeast, and Alaska Pacific University. Alaska is the only state that has no collegiate athletic programs that are members of NCAA Division I, although both Alaska-Fairbanks and Alaska-Anchorage maintain single sport membership in Division I for men's ice hockey.

The Alaska Department of Labor and Workforce Development operates AVTEC, Alaska's Institute of Technology. Campuses in Seward and Anchorage offer one-week to 11-month training programs in areas as diverse as Information Technology, Welding, Nursing, and Mechanics.

Alaska has had a problem with a "brain drain". Many of its young people, including most of the highest academic achievers, leave the state after high school graduation and do not return. , Alaska did not have a law school or medical school. The University of Alaska has attempted to combat this by offering partial four-year scholarships to the top 10% of Alaska high school graduates, via the Alaska Scholars Program.

Beginning in 1998, schools in rural Alaska must have at least 10 students to retain funding from the state, and campuses not meeting the number close. This was due to the loss in oil revenues that previously propped up smaller rural schools. In 2015, there was a proposal to raise that minimum to 25, but legislators in the state largely did not agree.

Transportation

Roads

Alaska has few road connections compared to the rest of the U.S. The state's road system, covering a relatively small area of the state, linking the central population centers and the Alaska Highway, the principal route out of the state through Canada. The state capital, Juneau, is not accessible by road, only a car ferry; this has spurred debate over decades about moving the capital to a city on the road system, or building a road connection from Haines. The western part of Alaska has no road system connecting the communities with the rest of Alaska.

At , the tunnel was the longest road tunnel in North America until 2007. The tunnel is the longest combination road and rail tunnel in North America.

Rail

Built around 1915, the Alaska Railroad (ARR) played a key role in the development of Alaska through the 20th century. It links north Pacific shipping through providing critical infrastructure with tracks that run from Seward to Interior Alaska by way of South Central Alaska, passing through Anchorage, Eklutna, Wasilla, Talkeetna, Denali, and Fairbanks, with spurs to Whittier, Palmer and North Pole. The cities, towns, villages, and region served by ARR tracks are known statewide as "The Railbelt". In recent years, the ever-improving paved highway system began to eclipse the railroad's importance in Alaska's economy.

The railroad played a vital role in Alaska's development, moving freight into Alaska while transporting natural resources southward, such as coal from the Usibelli coal mine near Healy to Seward and gravel from the Matanuska Valley to Anchorage. It is well known for its summertime tour passenger service.

The Alaska Railroad was one of the last railroads in North America to use cabooses in regular service and still uses them on some gravel trains. It continues to offer one of the last flag stop routes in the country. Until construction of the Parks Highway in the 1970s, the railroad provided the only land access to most of the region along its entire route.

In northern Southeast Alaska, the White Pass and Yukon Route also partly runs through the state from Skagway northwards into Canada (British Columbia and Yukon Territory), crossing the border at White Pass Summit. This line is now mainly used by tourists, often arriving by cruise liner at Skagway. It was featured in the 1983 BBC television series Great Little Railways.

The Alaska Rail network is not connected to Outside. (The nearest link to the North American railway network is the northwest terminus of the Canadian National Railway at Prince Rupert, British Columbia, several hundred miles to the southeast.) In 2000, the U.S. Congress authorized $6 million to study the feasibility of a rail link between Alaska, Canada, and the lower 48.

Some private companies provides car float service between Whittier and Seattle.

Marine transport
Many cities, towns and villages in the state do not have road or highway access; the only modes of access involve travel by air, river, or the sea.

Alaska's well-developed state-owned ferry system (known as the Alaska Marine Highway) serves the cities of southeast, the Gulf Coast and the Alaska Peninsula. The ferries transport vehicles as well as passengers. The system also operates a ferry service from Bellingham, Washington and Prince Rupert, British Columbia, in Canada through the Inside Passage to Skagway. The Inter-Island Ferry Authority also serves as an important marine link for many communities in the Prince of Wales Island region of Southeast and works in concert with the Alaska Marine Highway.

In recent years, cruise lines have created a summertime tourism market, mainly connecting the Pacific Northwest to Southeast Alaska and, to a lesser degree, towns along Alaska's gulf coast. The population of Ketchikan for example fluctuates dramatically on many days—up to four large cruise ships can dock there at the same time.

Air transport
Cities not served by road, sea, or river can be reached only by air, foot, dogsled, or snowmachine, accounting for Alaska's extremely well developed bush air services—an Alaskan novelty. Anchorage and, to a lesser extent Fairbanks, is served by many major airlines. Because of limited highway access, air travel remains the most efficient form of transportation in and out of the state. Anchorage recently completed extensive remodeling and construction at Ted Stevens Anchorage International Airport to help accommodate the upsurge in tourism (in 2012–2013, Alaska received almost two million visitors).

Regular flights to most villages and towns within the state that are commercially viable are challenging to provide, so they are heavily subsidized by the federal government through the Essential Air Service program. Alaska Airlines is the only major airline offering in-state travel with jet service (sometimes in combination cargo and passenger Boeing 737-400s) from Anchorage and Fairbanks to regional hubs like Bethel, Nome, Kotzebue, Dillingham, Kodiak, and other larger communities as well as to major Southeast and Alaska Peninsula communities.

The bulk of remaining commercial flight offerings come from small regional commuter airlines such as Ravn Alaska, PenAir, and Frontier Flying Service. The smallest towns and villages must rely on scheduled or chartered bush flying services using general aviation aircraft such as the Cessna Caravan, the most popular aircraft in use in the state. Much of this service can be attributed to the Alaska bypass mail program which subsidizes bulk mail delivery to Alaskan rural communities. The program requires 70% of that subsidy to go to carriers who offer passenger service to the communities.

Many communities have small air taxi services. These operations originated from the demand for customized transport to remote areas. Perhaps the most quintessentially Alaskan plane is the bush seaplane. The world's busiest seaplane base is Lake Hood, located next to Ted Stevens Anchorage International Airport, where flights bound for remote villages without an airstrip carry passengers, cargo, and many items from stores and warehouse clubs.

In 2006, Alaska had the highest number of pilots per capita of any U.S. state. In Alaska there are 8,795 active pilot certificates as of 2020. 
 Of these, there are 2,507 Private, 1,496 Commercial, 2,180 Airline Transport, and 2,239 student pilots. There are also 3,987 pilots with an Instrument rating and 1,511 Flight Instructors.

Other transport
Another Alaskan transportation method is the dogsled. In modern times (that is, any time after the mid-late 1920s), dog mushing is more of a sport than a true means of transportation. Various races are held around the state, but the best known is the Iditarod Trail Sled Dog Race, a  trail from Anchorage to Nome (although the distance varies from year to year, the official distance is set at ). The race commemorates the famous 1925 serum run to Nome in which mushers and dogs like Togo and Balto took much-needed medicine to the diphtheria-stricken community of Nome when all other means of transportation had failed. Mushers from all over the world come to Anchorage each March to compete for cash, prizes, and prestige. The "Serum Run" is another sled dog race that more accurately follows the route of the famous 1925 relay, leaving from the community of Nenana (southwest of Fairbanks) to Nome.

In areas not served by road or rail, primary transportation in summer is by all-terrain vehicle and in winter by snowmobile or "snow machine", as it is commonly referred to in Alaska.

Data transport
Alaska's internet and other data transport systems are provided largely through the two major telecommunications companies: GCI and Alaska Communications. GCI owns and operates what it calls the Alaska United Fiber Optic system and, as of late 2011, Alaska Communications advertised that it has "two fiber optic paths to the lower 48 and two more across Alaska. In January 2011, it was reported that a $1 billion project to connect Asia and rural Alaska was being planned, aided in part by $350 million in stimulus from the federal government.

Law and government

State government

Like all other U.S. states, Alaska is governed as a republic, with three branches of government: an executive branch consisting of the governor of Alaska and their appointees which head executive departments; a legislative branch consisting of the Alaska House of Representatives and Alaska Senate; and a judicial branch consisting of the Alaska Supreme Court and lower courts.

The state of Alaska employs approximately 16,000 people statewide.

The Alaska Legislature consists of a 40-member House of Representatives and a 20-member Senate. Senators serve four-year terms and House members two. The governor of Alaska serves four-year terms. The lieutenant governor runs separately from the governor in the primaries, but during the general election, the nominee for governor and nominee for lieutenant governor run together on the same ticket.

Alaska's court system has four levels: the Alaska Supreme Court, the Alaska Court of Appeals, the superior courts and the district courts. The superior and district courts are trial courts. Superior courts are courts of general jurisdiction, while district courts hear only certain types of cases, including misdemeanor criminal cases and civil cases valued up to $100,000.

The Supreme Court and the Court of Appeals are appellate courts. The Court of Appeals is required to hear appeals from certain lower-court decisions, including those regarding criminal prosecutions, juvenile delinquency, and habeas corpus. The Supreme Court hears civil appeals and may in its discretion hear criminal appeals.

State politics

Although in its early years of statehood Alaska was a Democratic state, since the early 1970s it has been characterized as Republican-leaning. Local political communities have often worked on issues related to land use development, fishing, tourism, and individual rights. Alaska Natives, while organized in and around their communities, have been active within the Native corporations. These have been given ownership over large tracts of land, which require stewardship.

Alaska was formerly the only state in which possession of one ounce or less of marijuana in one's home was completely legal under state law, though the federal law remains in force.

The state has an independence movement favoring a vote on secession from the United States, with the Alaskan Independence Party.

Six Republicans and four Democrats have served as governor of Alaska. In addition, Republican governor Wally Hickel was elected to the office for a second term in 1990 after leaving the Republican party and briefly joining the Alaskan Independence Party ticket just long enough to be reelected. He officially rejoined the Republican party in 1994.

Alaska's voter initiative making marijuana legal took effect on February 24, 2015, placing Alaska alongside Colorado and Washington as the first three U.S. states where recreational marijuana is legal. The new law means people over 21 can consume small amounts of cannabis. The first legal marijuana store opened in Valdez in October 2016.

Voter registration

Taxes
To finance state government operations, Alaska depends primarily on petroleum revenues and federal subsidies. This allows it to have the lowest individual tax burden in the United States. It is one of five states with no sales tax, one of seven states with no individual income tax, and—along with New Hampshire—one of two that has neither. The Department of Revenue Tax Division reports regularly on the state's revenue sources. The department also issues an annual summary of its operations, including new state laws that directly affect the tax division. In 2014, the Tax Foundation ranked Alaska as having the fourth most "business friendly" tax policy, behind only Wyoming, South Dakota, and Nevada.

While Alaska has no state sales tax, 89 municipalities collect a local sales tax, from 1.0 to 7.5%, typically 3–5%. Other local taxes levied include raw fish taxes, hotel, motel, and bed-and-breakfast 'bed' taxes, severance taxes, liquor and tobacco taxes, gaming (pull tabs) taxes, tire taxes and fuel transfer taxes. A part of the revenue collected from certain state taxes and license fees (such as petroleum, aviation motor fuel, telephone cooperative) is shared with municipalities in Alaska.

The fall in oil prices after the fracking boom in the early 2010s has decimated Alaska's state treasury, which has historically received about 85 percent of its revenue from taxes and fees imposed on oil and gas companies. The state government has had to drastically reduce its budget, and has brought its budget shortfall from over $2 billion in 2016 to under $500 million by 2018. In 2020, Alaska's state government budget was $4.8 billion, while projected government revenues were only $4.5 billion.

Federal politics

Alaska regularly supports Republicans in presidential elections and has done so since statehood. Republicans have won the state's electoral college votes in all but one election that it has participated in (1964). No state has voted for a Democratic presidential candidate fewer times. Alaska was carried by Democratic nominee Lyndon B. Johnson during his landslide election in 1964, while the 1960 and 1968 elections were close. Since 1972, however, Republicans have carried the state by large margins. In 2008, Republican John McCain defeated Democrat Barack Obama in Alaska, 59.49% to 37.83%. McCain's running mate was Sarah Palin, the state's governor and the first Alaskan on a major party ticket. Obama lost Alaska again in 2012, but he captured 40% of the state's vote in that election, making him the first Democrat to do so since 1968. In 2020, Joe Biden received 42.77% of the vote for president, marking the high point for a Democratic presidential candidate since Johnson's 1964 victory.

The Alaska Bush, central Juneau, midtown and downtown Anchorage, and the areas surrounding the University of Alaska Fairbanks campus and Ester have been strongholds of the Democratic Party. The Matanuska-Susitna Borough, the majority of Fairbanks (including North Pole and the military base), and South Anchorage typically have the strongest Republican showing.

Elections

Alaska has had a long history of primary defeats for incumbent U.S. Senators, with Ernest Gruening, Mike Gravel and Lisa Murkowski all being defeated for the nomination to their re-election. However, Murkowski won re-election with a write-in campaign. Despite this, Alaska has had some long-serving congressmen, with Ted Stevens serving as U.S. Senator for 40 years, and Don Young serving as the at-large representative for 49 years.

In the 2020 election cycle, Alaskan voters approved Ballot Measure 2. The measure passed by a margin of 1.1%, or about 4,000 votes. The measure requires campaigns to disclose the original source and any intermediaries for campaign contributions over $2,000. The measure also establishes non-partisan blanket primaries for statewide elections (like in Washington state and California) and ranked-choice voting (like in Maine). Measure 2 makes Alaska the third state with jungle primaries for all statewide races, the second state with ranked choice voting, and the only state with both.

The first race to use the new system of elections was the 2022 special election to fill Alaska's only U.S. House seat, left vacant by the death of Don Young, won by Mary Peltola, the first Democrat to win the House seat since 1972, and the first Alaskan Native to be elected to the United States Congress in history.

See also

 Index of Alaska-related articles
 Outline of Alaska
 List of boroughs and census areas in Alaska
 USS Alaska, 4 ships

Notes

References

External links

 
 Alaska's Digital Archives
 Alaska Inter-Tribal Council
 
 
 Who Owns/Manages Alaska? (map)
 Carl J. Sacarlasen Diary Extracts at Dartmouth College Library
 M.E. Diemer Alaska Photographs at Dartmouth College Library
 Alfred Hulse Brooks Photographs and Papers. Yale Collection of Western Americana, Beinecke Rare Book and Manuscript Library.

U.S. federal government
 Alaska State Guide from the Library of Congress
 Energy & Environmental Data for Alaska
 USGS real-time, geographic, and other scientific resources of Alaska 
 US Census Bureau
 Alaska State Facts
 Alaska Statehood Subject Guide from the Eisenhower Presidential Library 
 Alaska Statehood documents, Dwight D. Eisenhower Presidential Library

Alaska state government
 State of Alaska website
 Alaska State Databases
 Alaska Department of Natural Resources, Recorder's Office

 
Arctic Ocean
Former Russian colonies
States and territories established in 1959
States of the United States
States of the West Coast of the United States
1959 establishments in the United States
Western United States
Northern America
Enclaves and exclaves
Beringia
Exclaves in the United States